Single Best may refer to:

Single Best, album by Kou Shibasaki
Single Best (Day After Tomorrow album)
Single Best,  album by Exile (Japanese band), Rock & Pop Album Of The Year Award 2006
Single Best 10, Sharam Q 1996
Single Best, Ai Kawashima 2008